Tthebatthıe 196, formerly known as Fitzgerald 196, is an Indian reserve of the Smith's Landing First Nation in Alberta, located within the Regional Municipality of Wood Buffalo.

References

Indian reserves in Alberta